The Worth County Courthouse is located in Courthouse Square in Sylvester, Georgia and is a historic courthouse building serving Worth County, Georgia. It was added to the National Register of Historic Places in 1980.

It was designed by J.W. Golucke and built in 1905 at cost of $45,996.

See also
National Register of Historic Places listings in Worth County, Georgia

References

County courthouses in Georgia (U.S. state)
Courthouses on the National Register of Historic Places in Georgia (U.S. state)
Buildings and structures in Worth County, Georgia
Government buildings completed in 1905
1905 establishments in Georgia (U.S. state)